The Battle of Hingston Down took place in 838, probably at Hingston Down in Cornwall between a combined force of Cornish and Vikings on the one side, and West Saxons led by Ecgberht, King of Wessex on the other. The result was a West Saxon victory. According to the Anglo-Saxon Chronicle, which called the Cornish the West Welsh:
In this year a great naval force arrived among the West Welsh, and the latter combined with them and proceeded to fight against Ecgberht, king of the West Saxons. When he heard that, he then went hither with his army, and fought against them at Hingston Down, and put both the Welsh and the Danes to flight.

Historians of early medieval Britain identify the site of the battle as Hingston Down north-east of Callington in Cornwall, but some writers argue for Hingston Down near Moretonhampstead, Devon.

The British kingdom of Dumnonia, which covered Devon and Cornwall, survived into the early eighth century, when eastern Devon was conquered by Wessex. Conflict continued throughout the 8th century with Wessex pushing further west. In 815 King Egbert raided Cornwall 'from east to West' which, given later battles at Gafulford and Hingston Down probably indicates the conquest of the remaining parts of West Devon.

This was the last recorded battle between the Cornish and the West Saxons and ended roughly a century of warfare that began at the Battle of Llongborth in 710 (see Geraint of Dumnonia). The last known king of Cornwall, Dungarth, died in 875, but he is thought to have been an under-king subject to Wessex.

References

Sources

 

H
Hingston Down
Hingston Down
838
9th century in England
830s conflicts